Frank Beaumont "Beau" Smith (15 August 1885 – 2 January 1950), was an Australian film director, producer and exhibitor, best known for making low-budget comedies.

Smith made his first film in 1917, Our Friends, the Hayseeds. He went on to become one of the most prolific and popular Australian filmmakers of the silent era. Among his films were adaptations of the works of Banjo Paterson and Henry Lawson. His 1933 comedy The Hayseeds featured the first screen appearance of Cecil Kellaway.

Smith was famous for making his films quickly – sometimes he would complete shooting and post production within one month for budgets ranging from £600 to £1,200. His wife Elsie would comment on his scripts and his brother Gordon looked after company finances. He was sometimes known as "One Shot Beau" or "That'll Do Beau".

Biography

Early life
Smith was born in Hallett, South Australia, named after a popular single at the time, Armes Beaumont. He was educated at East Adelaide Public School.

Smith won writing competitions as a teenager.

He first worked as a journalist, writing for The Critic and The Register. When he was around 19 he established a small newspaper, Seaside Topics in the Victor Harbor region, which had a short run. Smith then helped C. J. Dennis found The Gadfly, which ran for several years.

Smith moved from Adelaide to Sydney in 1907 to work for The Bulletin. He also worked at Lone Hand. He was secretary to Fordyce Wheeler and worked as advertising manager for The Bulletin as well as writing for it.

Theatre Work
Smith moved into theatre, becoming secretary for theatrical entrepreneur William Anderson. He also worked as press secretary for Anderson's representative.

He toured Europe in 1909 and 1911. During the latter visit he arranged for a European troupe of midgets, "Tiny Town", to tour Australia. It was enormously successful, making a profit of 425%. Smith later toured the show in South Africa, where it was a success, and Canada, where it flopped due to opposition from existing circuses.

He also toured a show by suffragette Muriel Matters which was not a success because the main market, suffragettes, could see her at women's clubs for free.

Smith tried playwriting, working on an adaptation of On Our Selection by Steele Rudd. He wrote the first act on his own and then collaborated with Rudd. The play was eventually rewritten by Bert Bailey to great success.

In 1914 he went into theatre management.

He toured the plays Mr Wu (1914), The Barrier by Rex Beach, No Mother to Guide Her, A Girl's Cross Roads, The Glad Eye.

He was a fan of the works of Henry Lawson and adapted several of his stories for stage and film including While the Billy Boils.

He adapted Seven Little Australians into a play and toured it in 1914-15. He also wrote a play with Edward Dyson, Two Battlers and a Bear and a review Stop Your Nonsense.

Film career
Our Friends, the Hayseeds (1917) was shot in South Australia. Many of the cast had appeared in Beaumont Smith's theatrical productions of While the Billy Boils and Seven Little Australians. Smith followed it with The Hayseeds Come to Sydney (1917), shot in Sydney, The Hayseeds' Back-blocks Show (1917), shot in Brisbane, and The Hayseeds' Melbourne Cup (1918), filmed in Melbourne.

Smith's first non-Hayseed film was a wartime melodrama, Satan in Sydney (1918). He followed it with Desert Gold (1919), a race horse story, and the comedy Barry Butts In (1919) starring Barry Lupino.

In May 1919 he stopped producing films until better terms for exhibiting them could be found. He recommenced production in October. He spent a number of months in Hollywood, then returned to Australia to make The Man from Snowy River (1920).

Smith travelled to New Zealand to make the inter-racial romance The Betrayer (1921), then back in Australia did While the Billy Boils (1921), adapted from the stories of Henry Lawson (which Smith had previously adapted for the stage). He made a bushranging drama The Gentleman Bushranger (1922), then returned to Hayseed comedies with Townies and Hayseeds (1923) and Prehistoric Hayseeds (1923).

Smith made two films starring Arthur Tauchert, The Digger Earl (1924) and Joe (1924). Then he did two comedies starring Claude Dampier, Hullo Marmaduke (1925) and The Adventures of Algy (1925).

J C Williamsons
Shrinking profits led to Smith retiring from film-making in 1925. He moved to New Zealand and became managing director of Williamson Films (New Zealand) Ltd (later J. C. Williamson Picture Corporation Ltd), Wellington.

Return to Filmmaking
Smith returned to filmmaking to make The Hayseeds (1933), giving Cecil Kellaway his first lead in a film, and Splendid Fellows (1934).

He went back to Williamsons but eventually he and his wife sold out their interests in 1937 for £15,000 with an additional £7,000.

He retired to Killara, Sydney in 1938.

Personal life
Smith was married to Elsie Fleming from 1911, until his death. She was often an uncredited contributor with his work, helping him write scripts.

His brother Gordon managed his finances.

Death 
Smith died on 2 January 1950 in Royal North Shore Hospital, St Leonards. He was survived by his wife Elsie, he was cremated at Northern Suburbs Crematorium.

Legacy
The National Library of Australia tracked down a collection of 300 reels of Smith's films, including all his features. However, when the researchers arrived to collect it they were told that the entire collection had been burnt within the previous weeks, on the advice of an insurance company because of the film's inflammable nature.

Selected filmography 
 Our Friends, the Hayseeds (1917)
 The Hayseeds Come to Sydney (1917)
 The Hayseeds' Back-blocks Show (1917)
 The Hayseeds' Melbourne Cup (1918)
 Satan in Sydney (1918)
 Desert Gold (1919)
 Barry Butts In (1919)
 The Man from Snowy River (1920) – based on the poem by Banjo Paterson
A Journey through Filmland (1921) – documentary
 The Betrayer (1921)
 While the Billy Boils (1921) – based on the stories of Henry Lawson
 The Gentleman Bushranger (1922)
 Townies and Hayseeds (1923)
 Prehistoric Hayseeds (1923)
 The Digger Earl (1924)
 Joe (1924) – based on the story by Henry Lawson
 Hullo Marmaduke (1925)
 The Adventures of Algy (1925)
 The Hayseeds (1933)
 Splendid Fellows (1934)

Selected Theatre Credits
Seven Little Australians (1916)
While the Billy Boils (1916) – adaptation
Joe Wilson and His Mates (1916) – adaptation

References

External links 
 
 Beaumont Smith biography at Australian Dictionary of Biography
 Beaumont Smith at Trove
 Beaumont Smith items at the National Film and Sound Archive

Australian film directors
People from Sydney
1885 births
1950 deaths
People from Hallett, South Australia